The Hill State People's Democratic Party (HSPDP) is a regional political party active in the state of Meghalaya, northeast India. Formed in 1968 as a split from the All Party Hill Leaders Conference by Hopingstone Lyngdoh, the HSPDP has had representatives in the Meghalaya Legislative Assembly since the Assembly's first elections in 1972.  The HSPDP has been a junior member of coalition governments in Meghalaya on a number of occasions and following the 2018 election joined the National People's Party-led government of Chief Minister Conrad Sangma.

The HSPDP is part of the North-East Regional Political Front, which consists of the regional northeastern parties supporting the BJP-led  National Democratic Alliance government.

Origins 
Shri "Hoping Stone" Lyngdoh is the president of the HSPDP, one of three official political parties of the state of Meghalaya in India. He is the oldest serving representative member in Meghalaya and has never been defeated in Legislative Assembly election. In the initial period, the party as a whole championed the cause of separate statehood for Meghalaya, which became reality on 21 January 1972. People refer him by the respectful title of "Ma-Hoping". Now he is the current MLA of Nongstoin Constituency. The party as a whole won 4 seats in the legislative Assembly as of 2012.

References

 
Political parties in Meghalaya
Political parties with year of establishment missing
Recognised state political parties in India
1968 establishments in Assam
Political parties established in 1968